The Women's Football Association was a women's American football league formed in 2002 and which folded in 2003. Many of the league's members had been part of the Women's American Football League.

Teams
Central Conference
Birmingham Steel Magnolias
Georgia Enforcers
Indianapolis Vipers
New Orleans Voodoo Dolls
Southern Conference 
Carolina Crusaders
Jacksonville Dixie Blues
Orlando Fire
Tampa Bay Force

Championship game
2002–03 season — Jacksonville Dixie Blues won 68–20 over the Indianapolis Vipers.

See also
 List of leagues of American football
 Women's Football in the United States

References

External links
WFA Schedule

Defunct American football leagues in the United States
Sports leagues established in 2002
Sports leagues disestablished in 2003
2002 establishments in the United States